Dame Blanche or La Dame Blanche (French for "White Lady") may refer to:

 Dame blanche (dessert), comprising ice cream, whipped cream, and molten chocolate
 Dame Blanche (resistance), an underground network in German-occupied Belgium during World War I
 Dames blanches, female spirits or supernatural beings in French folklore and mythology
 La dame blanche, an opera by François-Adrien Boieldieu
 "La Dame Blanche" (Outlander), a 2016 episode of the television series Outlander

Wine grape varieties
 Dame Blanche, a synonym for Doña Blanca, grown primarily in Spain and Portugal
 Dame blanche, a synonym for Folle blanche, grown predominantly in Central France
 Dame blanche, a synonym for Jurançon, grown predominantly in Southwest France

See also
 Lady in White (disambiguation)
 White Woman (disambiguation)
 White Lady (disambiguation)